The Best Driver ESPY Award, known alternatively as the Best Auto Racing Driver ESPY Award, is an annual award honoring the achievements of an individual from the world of motorsports. It was first awarded as part of the ESPY Awards in 1993. The Best Driver ESPY Award trophy, designed by sculptor Lawrence Nowlan, has been presented annually to the racing driver adjudged to have performed the best in a given calendar year. Since 2004, the winner has been chosen by online voting through three to five choices selected by the ESPN Select Nominating Committee. Before that, determination of the winners was made by an panel of experts. Through the 2001 iteration of the ESPY Awards, ceremonies were conducted in February of each year to honor achievements over the previous calendar year; awards presented thereafter are conferred in July and reflect performance from the June previous.

The inaugural winner of the award was British driver Nigel Mansell who finished the 1992 season with a then record-breaking nine wins and fourteen pole positions en route to winning his sole Formula One World Drivers' Championship. Mansell moved to the Championship Auto Racing Teams the following year, and won the series title at the first attempt, earning him a second ESPY Award in 1994. Mansell is one of six drivers to have won the award more than once. , multiple NASCAR Cup Series champions Jeff Gordon (1996, 1998, 1999, 2007) and his teammate Jimmie Johnson (2008, 2009, 2010, 2011) have won the most awards with four each. NASCAR drivers have won more awards than any other motorsports series, with nineteen victories, followed by Formula One with five wins. It was not awarded in 2020 due to the COVID-19 pandemic. The most recent winner of the award was NASCAR driver Kyle Larson who won the award in 2022.

Winners and nominees

Statistics

See also
 Auto racing trophies and awards
 List of CART/Champ Car champions
 List of Formula One World Drivers' Champions
 List of Indy Racing League champions
 List of Monster Energy NASCAR Cup Series champions

Notes

References

External links

Auto racing trophies and awards
ESPY Awards